Disodium tetracarbonylferrate is the organoiron compound with the formula Na2[Fe(CO)4]. It is always used as a solvate, e.g., with tetrahydrofuran or dimethoxyethane, which bind to the sodium cation. An oxygen-sensitive colourless solid, it is a reagent in organometallic and organic chemical research.   The dioxane solvated sodium salt is known as Collman's reagent, in recognition of James P. Collman, an early popularizer of its use.

Structure
The dianion [Fe(CO)4]2− is isoelectronic with Ni(CO)4.  The iron center is tetrahedral, with Na+---OCFe interactions. It is commonly used with dioxane complexed to the sodium cation.

Synthesis
The reagent was originally generated in situ by reducing iron pentacarbonyl with sodium amalgam. Modern synthesis use sodium naphthalene or sodium benzophenone ketyls as the reducants:
Fe(CO)5 + 2 Na  →  Na2[Fe(CO)4]  +  CO

When a deficiency of sodium is used, the reduction affords deep yellow octacarbonyl diferrate:
2 Fe(CO)5 + 2 Na → Na2[Fe2(CO)8]  +  2 CO
Some specialized methods do not start with iron carbonyl.

Reactions
It is used to synthesise aldehydes from alkyl halides.
The reagent was originally described for the conversion of primary alkyl bromides to the corresponding aldehydes in a two-step, "one-pot" reaction:
Na2[Fe(CO)4]  +  RBr  →  Na[RFe(CO)4]  +  NaBr
This solution is then treated sequentially with PPh3 and then acetic acid to give the aldehyde, RCHO.

Disodium tetracarbonylferrate can be used to convert acid chlorides to aldehydes.  This reaction proceeds via the intermediacy of iron acyl complex.
Na2[Fe(CO)4]  +  RCOCl  →  Na[RC(O)Fe(CO)4]  +  NaCl 
Na[RC(O)Fe(CO)4]  +  HCl  →  RCHO  +  "Fe(CO)4"  +  NaCl

Disodium tetracarbonylferrate reacts with alkyl halides (RX) to produce alkyl complexes:
Na2[Fe(CO)4]  +  RX  →  Na[RFe(CO)4]  +  NaX 
Such iron alkyls can be converted to the corresponding carboxylic acid and acid halides:
Na[RFe(CO)4]  +  O2, H+  →→  RCO2H  + Fe...
Na[RFe(CO)4]  + 2 X2  →  RC(O)X  +  FeX2  +  3 CO  +  NaX

References

Further reading
 
 
 

Carbonyl complexes
Iron complexes
Sodium compounds
Ferrates